The Libyan Sibyl, named Phemonoe, was the prophetic priestess presiding over the Oracle of Zeus-Ammon (Zeus represented with the Horns of Ammon) at Siwa Oasis in the Libyan Desert.

The term sibyl comes (via Latin) from the ancient Greek word sibylla, meaning prophetess. There were many sibyls in the ancient world, but the Libyan Sibyl, in Classical mythology, foretold the "coming of the day when that which is hidden shall be revealed."

In Pausanias Description of Greece, the sibyl names her parents in her oracles:
I am by birth half mortal, half divine;
An immortal nymph was my mother, my father an eater of grain;
On my mother's side of Idaean birth, but my fatherland was red
Marpessus, sacred to the Mother, and the river Aidoneus. (Pausanias 10.12.3)

The Greeks say she was the daughter of Lamia – a daughter of Poseidon – and Zeus. Euripides mentions the Libyan Sibyl in the prologue of the Lamia.  The Greeks further state that she was the first woman to chant oracles, she lived most of her life in Samos, and that the name Sibyl was given her by the Libyans.

Serapion, in his epic verses, says that the Sibyl, even when dead, ceased not from divination. And he writes that what proceeded from her into the air after her death was what gave oracular utterances in voices and omens; and on her body being changed into earth, and the grass as natural growing out of it, whatever beasts happening to be in that place fed on it exhibited to men an accurate knowledge of futurity by their entrails. He thinks also, that the face seen in the moon is her soul.

Plutarch tells the story that Alexander the Great, after founding Alexandria, marched to Siwa Oasis where the sibyl is said to have confirmed him as both a divine personage and the legitimate Pharaoh of Egypt.

Notes

External links
Lamia entry in the Theoi Project

Sibyls
Children of Zeus